Batavia is a historical and geographical region in the Netherlands, forming large fertile islands in the river delta formed by the waters of the Rhine (Dutch: Rijn) and Meuse (Dutch: Maas) rivers. During the Roman empire, it was an important frontier region and source of imperial soldiers. Its name is possibly pre-Roman.

Administratively, the modern version, Betuwe, is a part of the modern province of Gelderland and although the rivers and provinces have changed over history it is roughly the same. Today it has the Waal river on the south and the Lek and Nederrijn in the north (all rivers which start in the delta itself and are branches of the Rhine or Maas). Historically, the former municipality of Rijnwaarden belonged to Betuwe, now in Zevenaar, which was cut off by the building of the Pannerdens Kanaal.

A major freight railroad, the Betuweroute, passes through the Betuwe. It was opened in 2007 after many years of controversy.

The Betuwe region is divided into 9 municipalities: Lingewaard, Arnhem (southern part), Nijmegen (northern part), Overbetuwe, Neder-Betuwe, Buren, Tiel, Culemborg and West Betuwe.

Pre-Roman

The "Batavian island" in the Rhine river was mentioned by Julius Caesar in his commentary Commentarii de Bello Gallico. The island's easternmost point is at a split in the Rhine, one arm being the Waal and the other the Lower Rhine/Old Rhine (hence the Latin name Insula Batavorum, "Island of the Batavi"). Much later Tacitus wrote that the people living there had originally been a tribe of the Chatti, a tribe in Germany never mentioned by Caesar, who were forced by internal dissension to move to their new home.

Tacitus also reports that before their arrival the area had been "an uninhabited district on the extremity of the coast of Gaul, and also of a neighbouring island, surrounded by the ocean in front, and by the river Rhine in the rear and on either side". In a more detailed description he writes: 
The island of the Batavi was the appointed rendezvous because of its easy landing-places, and its convenience for receiving the army and carrying the war across the river. For the Rhine after flowing continuously in a single channel or encircling merely insignificant islands, divides itself, so to say, where the Batavian territory begins, into two rivers, retaining its name and the rapidity of its course in the stream which washes Germany, till it mingles with the ocean. On the Gallic bank, its flow is broader and gentler; it is called by an altered name, the Vahal, by the inhabitants of its shore. Soon that name too is changed for the Mosa river, through whose vast mouth it empties itself into the same ocean.

Modern archaeologists disagree with Tacitus, noting that that island had a pre-Roman and pre-Germanic population, apparently already called the Batavians. Caesar indeed had not only implied the existence of pre-Roman Batavians, but also mentioned that the Belgic Menapii of the Flemish coast had settlements stretching as far as the beginning of the delta, near the modern border with Germany.

Roman era

During the Roman Empire there was a civitas of the Batavians, a Germanic tribe. It was described as a large island between rivers in the Rhine-Meuse delta, the modern equivalent of Betuwe. The Batavians shared the island with the Canninefates, to their west near the coast. Their Roman city was Nijmegen.

The name was also mentioned by Pliny the Elder, and it played a role in the account by Tacitus of the Germanic uprising of 68.

Its later Roman history is attested by Ammianus Marcellinus who mentions the Frankish Salians as a people living there. Zosimus is the only classical author who claims that they had first crossed the Rhine during the Roman upheavals and subsequent Germanic breakthrough in 260 AD. Both authors agree that from Batavia they were pushed south, into Toxandria.

Medieval
In the Carolingian and Ottonian periods in the early Middle Ages, Batavia, called Batua by the Franks, was an example of a Frankish gau that was based on much older Roman pagi. Several counts are recorded as having their counties there, and it is mentioned in the treaties such as the Treaty of Meerssen, that divided up Europe among the different Frankish kingdoms.

Later, it was mainly absorbed into the newer county of Guelders which had become established to the southeast.

Renaissance
In the Renaissance, the Dutch wanted to rediscover their pre-medieval Batavi culture and history. This common history raised Batavi to the status of cultural ancestors to all Dutch people (see The Batavian revival). They occasionally called themselves, or their things (Batavia), Batavians, resulting even in a short-lived Batavian Republic. The name Batavia was also taken to the colonies such as the Dutch East Indies, where they renamed the city of Jayakarta to become Batavia from 1619 until about 1942, when its name was changed to Djakarta (short for the former name Jayakarta, later respelt Jakarta; see: History of Jakarta). The name was also used in Suriname, where they founded Batavia, Suriname, and in the United States where the Holland Land Company founded the city and the town of Batavia, New York. This name spread further west in the United States to such places as Batavia, Illinois, near Chicago, and Batavia, Ohio.

20th century
In the aftermath of the failed allied Operation Market Garden, the Germans attempted to retake the allied gains during the Battle of the Nijmegen salient but were unsuccessful. When the Pannerdens Kanaal was dug between 1701 and 1709, the easternmost tip of the Betuwe (including the towns of Pannerden and Lobith) was cut off from the rest of the region.

In 1995, a large part of this area had to be evacuated because the rivers threatened to overflow. This did not happen, but it raised the debate again about whether to reinforce the dikes.

References 

Batavian Republic
Batavi (Germanic tribe)
Regions of Gelderland
Regions of the Netherlands
Rhine–Meuse–Scheldt delta
Historical regions